Unfinished Business is an album by Andy Bown, currently the keyboard player in Status Quo and a former member of Judas Jump and The Herd.

The album was Bown's first solo album since joining Status Quo in 1976, and was released by Cherry Red Records in September 2011.

The track listing for the album was:

 "Ruby And Roy"
 "Rubber Gloves"
 "A Matter Of Time" 
 "When The Lights Went On"
 "Keeping The Wolf Away"
 "Right As Ninepence"
 "I Got A Million"
 "Tick My Box"
 "Built To Last"
 "A Good Innings"
All songs were written by Andy Bown.

A music video was made to accompany the lead song "Rubber Gloves", which was produced and directed by John Keeling, and recorded at Richmond Studios, London, England. The video clip was included as the enhanced portion of the original CD release.

In 2019, the album was reissued by NoCut Entertainment with new artwork and an additional song "Dancing in the Rain".

Line-up
 Andy Bown - vocals, keyboards, guitars, harmonica
 Mick Rogers - guitars
 Trevor Bolder - bass on all songs except tracks 1, 2, 4 & 10
 Brad Lang - bass on tracks 1, 2, 4 & 10
 Henry Spinetti - drums
 Juliet Rogers and Sylvia Mason-James - backing vocals
 Mike Paxman - producer

References

External links

Article on 'Unfinished Business' by Andy Bown on Cherry Red Records Website
Official homepage of Andy Bown

Cherry Red Records albums
2011 albums